The Canadian Parks and Wilderness Society (CPAWS) ( was founded in 1963 to help protect Canada's wilderness.

Overview

CPAWS was initially known as the National and Provincial Parks Association (NPPAC), which was formed in 1963 with a focus on revitalizing Canadian's appreciation of wilderness parks. For many years, NPPAC published the Park News: The Journal of the National and Provincial Parks Association of Canada—an "outlet for a variety of articles on Canadian parks that will be of interest to the general public."

For more than 50 years it has championed the protection of Canada's forests, waters, and parks with a focus on protecting large, connected areas. To date, CPAWS has succeeded in helping to protect over 50 million hectares. CPAWS vision is to keep at least half of Canada's public land and water wild – forever.  As a national charity with 13 chapters, over 50,000 supporters, and hundreds of volunteers, CPAWS works collaboratively with governments, local communities, industry, and indigenous peoples to protect Canada's public land and water.

CPAWS has submitted reports to the federal government related to a number of its key program areas. Their 2016 report subtitled, "Protecting Canada's National Parks a Call for Renewed Commitment to Nature Conservation", was submitted as evidence to the House of Commons Standing Committee on Environment and Sustainable Development.  The CPAWS parks program director, Alison Woodley and Sabine Jessen, CPAWS' national director of their oceans program, were invited expert witnesses in discussions at a May 5, 2016 meeting of the House of Commons of Canada.

Program Areas

Forests 
From the vast northern Boreal forest to the temperate forests stretching across Ontario, Quebec and the Maritimes, Canada is home to some of the largest unbroken tracts of forest on the planet. CPAWS' goal is to conserve at least half of Canada's Boreal forests, and to create a network of large conservation areas within the temperate eastern woodlands of New Brunswick, Nova Scotia, Quebec and Ontario.

Campaign Examples
 Helping protect Alberta's Little Smoky Caribou
 Implementing the Canadian Boreal Forest Agreement
 Keeping the Restigouche Wild

Parks and Protection Areas 
Canada has one of the oldest and most extensive parks systems in the world. CPAWS advocates for new parks and acts as a watchdog to ensure that existing ones are well-managed. With pressures on Canada's wilderness growing, creating more parks and ensuring existing ones are well-funded and protected is more important than ever.

Campaign Examples
 Stand up for Jasper!
 Join the movement for Canada's parks!
 Ensure the Rouge is protected forever
 Add your voice for protecting Thaidene Nene – the Land of the Ancestors!
 Keep the Flathead Wild
 Create a National Park in South Okanagan-Similkameen
 Celebrate the expansion of the world-famous Nahanni!
 Sign the Peel statement of support

Oceans 
Canada has the longest coastline in the world, and a marine area that is half the size of the country. But its marine ecosystems tend to be out of sight and out of mind, and they are in serious trouble. CPAWS' long term goal is for Canada to complete a national network of marine protected areas that protect at least half of Canada's oceans, with an objective to meet the international target of protecting at least 10% of coastal and marine areas by 2020.  

Campaign Examples
 Dare to be Deep: Protect Canada's Oceans 
 Southern Strait of Georgia  
 Protegeons notre fleuve

Grasslands 
Grasslands are some of the most unusual ecosystems in the world, but are also considered the most threatened, with the highest concentration of species at risk. CPAWS chapters in British Columbia, Alberta and Saskatchewan are working to protect these unique landscapes and their rich biodiversity.

Connecting Canadians to Nature 
There is more and more evidence emerging that increasingly urban Canadians are less and less likely to be active outdoors, or to have the opportunity to directly experience nature. Connecting Canadians to Nature is about building a culture of wilderness advocates through wilderness experiences. The Get Outside program offered by certain chapters (BC, Wildlands League) is an important component of this program area.  CPAWS' Southern Alberta chapter also offers an extensive nature education program for school-age children and youth.

Wildlife 
CPAWS focuses on protecting large tracts of land, oceans and great freshwater lakes so species like grizzlies, woodland caribou and wolverine have room to roam, and whales and fish can thrive. 

Examples of species CPAWS is working to protect
 Woodland caribou herds have declined significantly in the last 100 years. Several herds have disappeared completely. Evidence suggests the majority of these herds will go extinct without conservation action. 
 "Atlantic Salmon - The Restigouche River and its tributaries support one of the most productive wild Atlantic salmon populations, with some of the largest salmon, in eastern Canada. CPAWS is working to protect the Restigouche watershed."   
 Grizzly bears need room to roam, and Canada's interconnected mountain parks are ideal habitat.  However, development and industrial pressure in the Rocky Mountain region are reducing the bears' numbers.

Collaborative activities 
In 2015, Mountain Equipment Coop (MEC) partnered with CPAWS as the project sponsor for the "MEC Big Wild Challenge" to encourage people to connect more with nature by being more active outdoors. This included a challenge for individuals to complete a specific Trail Run on September 19 in participating municipalities or to design their own outdoors in nature challenge. The overall goal was to protect the wilderness.

History 
CPAWS was initially known as the National and Provincial Parks Association (NPPAC). The NPPAC formed in 1963 with a focus on revitalizing Canadian's appreciation of wilderness parks.  Since this time CPAWS' role and national network has expanded.

The organization has been a key citizens' group in many decisions relating to the establishment of new parks and wilderness areas and in obtaining significant conservation outcomes through land-use planning processes in many parts of Canada. CPAWS' name through history has been strongly associated with iconic Canadian parks such as Banff, Nahanni, Algonquin, Quetico and Tatshenshini, and with establishing the Muskwa-Kechika Management Area. CPAWS' role has been significant in many other successful conservation efforts as well, ranging from the establishment of the Forest Stewardship Council to designing land-use planning processes that result in nature protection through a variety of mechanisms.

CPAWS has also been at the forefront of the drive to establish marine protected areas in Canada and played a leading role in the passage of the National Marine Conservation Areas Act.  It continues to be Canada's leading voice for parks and protected areas management.

James B Harkin Conservation Award 
In 1972, CPAWS established the James B. Harkin Conservation Award, which is awarded to Canadians who promote conservation. Recipients of the Harkin Award include:
 2013 John Marsh, Ric Careless and Harvey Locke
 2011 Nikita Lopoukhine
 2010 The Panel on Ecological Integrity of Canada's National Parks
 2008 Bob Peart
 2007 Dr. Jim Thorsell
 2005 Dr. J. Gordon Nelson
 2003 Mike Harcourt, Derek Thompson
 2002 Elizabeth May
 2001 Monte Hummel
 2000 Mike and Diane McIvor
 1999 Dr. Stephen Herrero
 1998 Dr. John Theberge (with special recognition of Mary Theberge)
 1997 Cliff Wallis
 1996 Chief Emeritus Ruby Dunstan
 1994 Dr. J. Stan Rowe (d. April 6, 2004)
 1992 Jennifer Shay, Vernon C. Brink
 1990 Andy Russell, (d. June 1, 2005)
 1989 Gavin Henderson
 1987 Alex T. Davidson
 1985 Michael J. Nolan, George W. Scotter, Charles Sauriol
 1981 George F. Ledingham
 1978 William Fergus Lothian
 1975 Roderick Haig-Brown (author)|Roderick Haig-Brown
 1972 Hon. Jean Chrétien

References

External links
Canadian Parks and Wilderness Society (National)
List of CPAWS chapters, with links

Nature conservation organizations based in Canada